Andrés Gómez defeated Andre Agassi in the final, 6–3, 2–6, 6–4, 6–4 to win the men's singles tennis title at the 1990 French Open. He became the first Ecuadorian, male or female, to win a major, and this was his only major title in singles. Agassi later alleged in his 2009 autobiography that his defeat in the final was partly due to issues with his wig. 

Michael Chang was the defending champion, but he was defeated by Agassi in the quarterfinals. For the first time since the 1977 Australian Open, none of the semifinalists had previously won a major title.

Until the 2002 Australian Open, this would be the last time that the top two seeds would lose in the first round of a major, with Stefan Edberg and Boris Becker losing to Sergi Bruguera and Goran Ivanišević respectively.

Seeds

Draw

Finals

Top half

Section 1

Section 2

Section 3

Section 4

Bottom half

Section 5

Section 6

Section 7

Section 8

References

External links
 Association of Tennis Professionals (ATP) – 1990 French Open Men's Singles draw
1990 French Open – Men's draws and results at the International Tennis Federation

Men's Singles
French Open by year – Men's singles